College De La Salle Frères is a private Catholic school in Amman, Jordan, established in 1950. It is sponsored by the Institute of the Brothers of the Christian Schools, also known as the De La Salle Brothers. It is part of a network of such schools operating in 80 countries around the world.

History
The founding of a De la Salle school in Amman came as a response to Nehme Sama'an's personal invitation to open a Lasallian school in the city.

In 1950, Alberto Gori, the Latin Patriarch of Jerusalem, consented to the opening of College De La Salle in Amman. On August 16, permission was granted by the government to open the school under the name "College de la Salle". The school opened its doors for the first time in Jabal Amman, in a rented house near the grounds of the existing CMS School. On September 19, the school opened with 50 pupils registered in three classes, for the coming school year to begin on October 2. By October 14, the school had 118 pupils.

By 1952, the school had grown to 333 pupils, and the small rented house where the school had functioned for the previous two years became too small. On December 2, 1952, a piece of land was bought near the Abdali camp, situated outside of the city limits and without access by road.

On January 20, 1953, the school finalised plans to build the school, but work did not begin on construction until May 12 due to a delay in obtaining the necessary authorizations from the relevant ministries. By October 7, the new building opened its doors, despite the building not yet being finished. There were 350 pupils in the new building, while 89 children remained in the rented house in Jabal Amman.

The school today
At present, the school has 1500 pupils with a staff of about 150 teachers 
. The school is open to boys and girls who wish to study for the Jordanian certificate of Secondary Education (Tawjihi), IGCSE O-level and GCE A-level, SAT and the International Baccalaureate Diploma.

The school's principal is Omar Salah.

References

Schools in Amman
Catholic schools in Jordan
Private schools in Jordan
International schools in Jordan
French international schools in Asia
Lasallian schools
1950 establishments in Jordan
Educational institutions established in 1950